Bryaninops erythrops, known commonly as the translucent coral goby or Erythrops goby , is a species of marine fish in the family Gobiidae.

The translucent coral goby is widespread throughout the tropical waters of the Indo-Pacific area, including the Red Sea.

This fish is a small size that can reach a maximum size of 2.3 cm length.

References

External links
 

erythrops
Fish described in 1906
Taxa named by David Starr Jordan
Taxa named by Alvin Seale